Frazee may refer to:

 Frazee (surname)
 Frazee, Minnesota, a small American city.
 Frazee Paint, a defunct paint company in the western United States (acquired by Sherwin-Williams).